Doug Fine is an American author, journalist, humorist, and goat herder.

Early life
Fine left the East Coast of the United States for college in 1989. Shortly thereafter, he strapped a pack on his back and began his career as a freelance journalist for such organizations as The Washington Post, Salon, U.S. News & World Report, Sierra, Wired, Outside, National Public Radio, and many other venues. His investigative reporting took him to five continents, often to remote locations like Burma, Rwanda, Laos, Guatemala and Tajikistan.  One of his dispatches, on Burmese democracy efforts, was read into the Congressional Record.  Fine won numerous awards for his radio reporting from rural Alaska before he moved to New Mexico.

Not Really An Alaskan Mountain Man
In an experiment to see if someone raised in suburban consumer culture could manage a comfortable life in an extremely rural situation, Fine moved to a remote part of Alaska in the winter of 1998. The result was his first book, Not Really An Alaskan Mountain Man, published by Alaska Northwest Books, an imprint of Graphic Arts Center Publishing. As Fine works to hone what he calls his "Indigenous Gene," the book is a document of wilderness adventure as Fine learns how to live in a one-room cabin surrounded by moose and "non-liberals."

Farewell, My Subaru
Fine's second book, Farewell, My Subaru, was published March 24, 2009 by Villard Books, an imprint of Random House. The book documents life at Fine's Funky Butte Ranch. It became a bestseller and is now in its seventh printing, with Chinese and Korean language editions. Fine's challenges in the book come from dealing with his mischievous goats, setting up his Funky Butte Ranch's solar power system, converting his used truck to run on vegetable oil, and growing his ranch's own crops.

Farewell, My Subaru'''s critical acclaim in national and international media includes comparisons to Bill Bryson and Douglas Adams, landing Fine television interviews on CNN and on The Tonight Show with Jay Leno.

Too High to Fail

Fine's third book, Too High to Fail: Cannabis and the New Green Economic Revolution, was published by Gotham Books, an imprint of Penguin Group, on August 2, 2012. Pre-publication reviews included a starred Kirkus Reviews review reading in part, "Fine examines how the American people have borne the massive economic and social expenditures of the failed Drug War, which is "as unconscionably wrong for America as segregation and DDT." A captivating, solidly documented work rendered with wit and humor." Fine began promoting the book with an appearance on the Conan O'Brien show on July 25, 2012. Three weeks after publication, Too High to Fail debuted at #2 on the Denver Post bestseller list.

Personal life
Fine lives on the solar-powered Funky Butte Ranch, where he is a columnist for New Mexico Magazine.

Works
 Not Really An Alaskan Mountain Man (2004)
 Farewell, My Subaru (2008)
 Too High to Fail (2012)
 Hemp Bound (2014)
 American Hemp Farmer'' (2020)

References

External links
  Doug Fine's official website
 
  (@organiccowboy)
 

American male writers
Living people
Writers from Alaska
Writers from New Mexico
Writers from New York (state)
Stanford University alumni
Year of birth missing (living people)
Cannabis writers